Stephanitis pyri, the pear lace bug, is a species of lace bug in the family Tingidae. It is found in Northern Africa, Southern and Central Europe, and Asia. The species is considered a pest for apple and pear trees, and is said to be polyphagous. S.pyri was first described by Johan Christian Fabricius in 1775.

References 

Tingidae
Insects described in 1775